The Kaup–Kupershmidt equation (named after David J. Kaup and Boris Abram Kupershmidt) is the nonlinear fifth-order partial differential equation

It is the first equation in a hierarchy of integrable equations with the Lax operator

 .

It has properties similar (but not identical) to those of the better-known KdV hierarchy in which the Lax operator has order 2.

References

External links 
 

Partial differential equations
Integrable systems